Thomas Kläsener (born 14 August 1976 in Gelsenkirchen) is a German former professional footballer who played as a defender.

Honours
 UEFA Cup: 1996–97
 DFB-Pokal: 2001–02; runners-up 2004–05
 Bundesliga runners-up: 2004–05
 DFL-Ligapokal: 2005
 UEFA Intertoto Cup: 2004

References

External links
 

1976 births
Living people
Association football defenders
German footballers
SG Wattenscheid 09 players
FC Schalke 04 players
Rot-Weiss Essen players
SC Paderborn 07 players
FC Augsburg players
RB Leipzig players
FC Schalke 04 II players
Bundesliga players
2. Bundesliga players
Sportspeople from Gelsenkirchen
Footballers from North Rhine-Westphalia